The Museo Negrense de La Salle (lit: Negrense de La Salle Museum) is located within the campus of the University of St. La Salle in Bacolod, Philippines beside the St. La Salle Coliseum. It is the only school-based museum in the Negros region.

History

The museum was officially named Museo Negrense de La Salle in 1997. The Administration decided to fuse the University Research Institute with the repository and the addition of artifacts and relics donated by the Vega family under the care of Cecile Nava, PhD.

Collections
The Ledesma Collection
The Vega Collection
The Esteban Collection
The Velayo-Javelosa Collection
The Puentevella Collection

See also
Balay Negrense
The Ruins (mansion)
Hacienda Rosalia
Silliman Hall
Dizon-Ramos Museum
Dr. Jose Corteza Locsin Ancestral House

References

External links 
 http://www.usls.edu.ph/Museo%20Negrense/
 http://asemus.museum/museum/museo-negrense-de-la-salle-philippines/
 https://looloo.com/p/museum-negrense-de-la-salle-bacolod-city
 https://sites.google.com/site/museumsofthephilippines/directory/alphabetical-list--n-z/museum-negrense-de-la-salle

Buildings and structures in Bacolod
Museums in the Philippines
Tourist attractions in Bacolod
University of St. La Salle